The Chinese famine of 1906–1907 struck the middle and lower course of Huai River in Qing Dynasty from Autumn 1906 to Spring 1907, administratively in northern Anhui and northern Jiangsu provinces. This Chinese famine was directly caused by the 1906 China floods (April–October 1906), which hit the Huai River particularly hard and destroyed both the summer and autumn harvest.

Affected area

Northern Anhui
On 21 December 1906, Shen Bao reported 16 counties in northern Anhui to have particular high mortalities. The edict by Emperor Guangxu on 9 February 1907 waived agricultural taxes to 40 counties in northern Anhui. The 40 counties were:.

Northern Jiangsu
On 29 November 1906, Duanfang, the Viceroy of the Two Yangtze Provinces requested Emperor Guangxu to permit Jiangsu to redirect the imperial taxes to disaster relief. He cited 13 counties to be disaster-stricken.

Death toll
The primary sources only report fatalities in selected villages or counties. On 21 December 1906, Shen Bao, a leading Shanghai newspaper, reported "a precise death toll has become clear recently in 16 respective counties in Anhui" and amounted to 23,300. Another newspaper reported that victims amounted to 5,000 daily.

Anhui and Jiangsu had a combined population of 42.1 million as of 1911. Two modern commentaries estimate the total famine deaths in the range of 20–25 million, implying that most of the population of northern Anhui and northern Jiangsu population were wiped out, but offering no explanation on how the calculation is made. As author Bas Dianda commented:

It is very difficult to distinguish fatalities due to the famine from deaths caused by the violence; however, some estimate placed the excess of lethality of the period at 20–25 million dead [...] Such a figure, though including deaths from starvation as well as repression, are appalling."

Relief work
It is the first time in Qing dynasty history when the government formally acknowledged and collaborated with private organizations in disaster relief work ("官义合办"), which attracted a lot of academic interest. The relief campaign is coordinated by Sheng Xuanhuai and Lü Haihuan, two statesmen of Jiangsu origin. The lack of Anhui elites in Shanghai, however, led to a huge funding disparity to the much more stricken northern Anhui.

Most of the foreign relief fund came from American missionaries. The American Red Cross and the American newspaper Christian Herald furnished over two-thirds of foreign funds sent to China. The Central China Famine Relief Fund Committee was established to coordinate foreign efforts.

On 26 June 1907, The Sydney Morning Herald reported that the crisis was at an end.

See also
List of famines in China

References

External links 

 CHINESE FAMINE A PERIL.; American Consul Predicts Dangerous Outcome of Terrible Conditions.

1906
1907
1906 in China
1907 in China
20th-century famines
Disasters in Henan
Disasters in Anhui
Disasters in Jiangsu
Disasters in Qing dynasty
1906 disasters in China
1907 disasters in China